Kobra and the Lotus is the second studio album by the Canadian heavy metal ensemble of the same name.  Released on August 6, 2012, the album was produced by Kevin Churko.

Background 
The album was recorded in early 2011 with producer Julius Butty, who later toured the United Kingdom.  Once the ensemble was signed to Universal Music Group, Kevin Churko had the group create four additional songs, with Churko producing, remixing and remastering the entire work.

Track listing 
50 Shades of Evil
Welcome to My Funeral
Forever One
Heaven's Veins
My Life
Nayana
Sanctuary
Lover of the Beloved
No Rest for the Wicked
Aria of Karmika

Credit

Personnel
Kobra Paige - lead vocals
Jasio Kulakowski - guitars
Peter Dimov - bass
Lord Griffin Kissack - drums

Additional personnel
Charlie Del Magierowski - additional guitars
Simon Paul - artwork, layout
Darren "Jeter" Magierowski - engineering
Kevin Churko - producer
Julius Butty - producer

References 

2012 albums
Kobra and the Lotus albums
Albums produced by Kevin Churko